Kubota is a Japanese tractor and heavy equipment manufacturing company.

Kubota may also refer to:

Kubota (surname), a Japanese surname
Kubota Domain, a Japanese domain of the Edo period
Kubota, Saga, a former town of Saga Prefecture